Aucha velans, the  tide-watching mangrove moth, is a moth of the family Noctuidae. The species was first described by Francis Walker in 1858. It is found in Sri Lanka, Singapore and Philippines.

The adult has a wingspan of 28–35 mm. They are found on the stems of Avicennia mangroves in a characteristic position where adults perch head down on tree trunks. Caterpillars are edge feeders of Avicennia species. Late instars reach the ground and pupate inter-tidally under rotting logs or in algal mats. They are major pests on mangroves and considered as severe defoliators.

References

Moths of Asia
Moths described in 1857
Amphipyrinae